Kenizé Hussain de Kotwara, generally known as Kenizé Mourad, (born 1939) is a French journalist and novelist. Until 1983, she was a reporter for the Nouvel Observateur working in the Middle East. She then turned to literature, publishing the international best-seller De la part de la princesse morte (Regards from the Dead Princess) in 1987 which told the story of her family.  Les jardins de Badalpour, further documenting her family history, followed in 1998.

Biography

Born in Paris in November 1939, Kenizé Hussain de Kotwara is the daughter of Selma Hanımsultan, who was the daughter of Hatice Sultan and the grand-daughter of Murad V, Sultan of the Ottoman Empire. Her father was the Indian Raja of Kotwara, Sajid Husain Zaidi. After her mother died in poverty when she was only a two years old, she was brought up in a Catholic environment by a French family. Kenizé chose to use the name Mourad in honour of her great grandfather who spent 30 years in prison and had no life.

In 1970, on graduating in sociology and psychology from the Sorbonne, she became a reporter for Le Nouvel Observateur in the Middle East, covering the Iranian revolution and the war in Lebanon. After working as a journalist for 12 years, she decided to turn to literature, upset by the censorship she experienced. "My work was never openly rejected," she explains, "but instead I would be told 'The article is too long' or the story would be delayed constantly until I gave up."

From 1983, she conducted four years of detailed research in Turkey, Lebanon and India as a basis for her novel De la part de la princesse morte which was published in 1987. It has been translated into 34 languages with English versions titled Memoirs of an Ottoman Princess and Regards from the Dead Princess. After further research in India, she continued the story of her family in Les jardins de Badalpour, published in 1998 and subsequently translated into 12 languages.

More recently, she has published Le parfum de notre terre : Voix de Palestine et d'Israël (2003) and Dans la ville d'or et d'argent (2010), translated into English as Our sacred land: voices of the Palestine-Israeli conflict and In the city of silver and gold: the story of Begum Hazrat Mahal.

References

1939 births
Living people
Writers from Paris
20th-century French journalists
20th-century French novelists
French people of Indian descent
French people of Turkish descent
French women journalists
French women writers
Ottoman dynasty
20th-century French women